A federal building is a building housing local offices of various government departments and agencies in countries with a federal system, especially when the central government is referred to as the "federal government". 

Federal buildings in the United States often include passport offices, immigration services and FBI field offices.

United States

Canada 

Notable Federal buildings in Canada include:
  Complexe Guy-Favreau, Montréal
 Dominion Public Building, Halifax
 Federal Building, Edmonton
 Government of Canada Building, Moncton
 Government of Canada Building, North York

References

Federal buildings